This is a list of small airlines and helicopter airlines of Russia.

See also
 List of airlines
 Babyflot
 List of airlines of Russia
 List of VIP airlines of Russia
 List of airports in Russia

References

Russia
Airlines
Airlines, small